NTV Patria or Nezavisna televizija Patria is a Bosnian local commercial Cable television channel based in Doboj, Bosnia and Herzegovina. The program is mainly produced in Serbian.

References

External links 
 NTV Patria in Facebook

Television stations in Bosnia and Herzegovina
Television channels and stations established in 1999
Companies of Bosnia and Herzegovina
1999 establishments in Bosnia and Herzegovina